Three ships of the Royal Navy have been named HMS Swordfish after the fish.

  was a 330-ton destroyer launched in 1895 and sold in 1910.
  was a steam-powered submarine launched in 1916. She was converted into a surface patrol boat in 1917 and renamed S1.
  was an S-class submarine launched in 1931 and sunk by a naval mine in the English Channel in 1940.

References

External links
 Royal Navy History

Royal Navy ship names